Sayed Jalal ( Persian:سید جلال) was a candidate in the 2009 Afghanistan presidential election.

Early life 

As a child in Kabul, Sayed Jalal was known in Afghanistan and abroad for his prodigious skills in mathematics. At the age of 9, Jalal came to the United States where he interviewed with several top American colleges, including Columbia University. However, Jalal was not able to attend college in the U.S., because Hafizullah Amin demanded his return to Afghanistan and then forced to him and his father to move to Russia. There, Jalal attended Moscow University where he was the youngest student ever, but he did not earn any degrees.

After leaving Russia, Jalal and his father took refuge in Pakistan before finally immigrating to Saudi Arabia.

Political background 

Sayed Jalal has negotiated ceasefires and hostage releases 
between The Northern Alliance, The Taliban, and Iran. He operates within a network of influence that once included Benazir Bhutto.

Jalal claims to campaign on a platform that rejects the notion that Afghan politics must be tribal and divisive. He claims to seek an end to warlord politics and is a strong critic of the government of Hamid Karzai, which he views as weak, incompetent, and corrupt. The current political atmosphere of Afghanistan combined with Jalal's message of unity and hope has led some Afghans to compare him to Barack Obama.

A concern in the elections was that Jalal lacked political experience and international support. It was also suggested that Jalal does not know how to speak formal Persian by many Afghans within and outside Afghanistan.

References

External links 
Al Jazeera (in Arabic): http://www.aljazeera.net/NR/exeres/8667FDB3-39A4-4F66-AA5E-3265379D5F80.htm
BBC : http://news.bbc.co.uk/2/hi/south_asia/203926.stm
Ariana :

Living people
Afghan politicians
Year of birth missing (living people)